Lillian Hall-Davis (23 June 1898 – 25 October 1933) was an English actress during the silent film era, featured in major roles in English film and a number of German, French and Italian films.

Born Lilian Hall Davis, the daughter of a London taxi driver, her films included a part-colour version of Pagliacci (1923), The Passionate Adventure (1924), Blighty (1927), The Ring (1927) and The Farmer's Wife (1928), the latter two both directed by Alfred Hitchcock, who at the time considered her his "favourite actress." She had a lead role in a "lavish production" of Quo Vadis (1924), an Italian film directed by Gabriellino D'Annunzio and Georg Jacoby.

Hall-Davis also appeared in As We Lie (1927), a comedy short film made in the Lee DeForest Phonofilm sound-on-film process, co-starring and directed by Miles Mander.

Hall-Davis did not make the transition to sound films; in 1933 her "sharp career decline and health problems" prompted her to commit suicide by turning on the gas oven and cutting her own throat at home in the Golders Green area of London.

Filmography

 La p'tite du sixième (1917)
 The Admirable Crichton (1918)
 The Romance of Old Bill (1918)
 Ernest Maltravers (1920)
 The Honeypot (1920)
 Love Maggy (1921)
 The Wonderful Story (1922)
 The Faithful Heart (1922)
 Brown Sugar (1922)
 Stable Companions (1922)
 The Game of Life (1922)
 If Four Walls Told (1922)
 The Knockout (1923)
 Married Love (1923)
 The Right to Strike (1923)
 Castles in the Air (1923)
 The Hotel Mouse (1923)
 Afterglow (1923)
 I Pagliacci (1923)
 A Royal Divorce (1923)
 The Passionate Adventure (1924)
 The Eleventh Commandment (1924)
 Quo Vadis (1924)
 The Unwanted (1924)
 The Farmer from Texas (1925)
 Express Train of Love (1925)
 Nitchevo (1926)
 Three Cuckoo Clocks (1926)
 Love is Blind (1926)
 If Youth But Knew (1926)
 Roses of Picardy (1927)
 The Prey of the Wind (1927)
 Blighty (1927)
 The Ring (1927)
 Boadicea (1928)
 The White Sheik (1928)
 The Farmer's Wife (1928)
 Tommy Atkins (1928)
 Volga Volga (1928)
 Just for a Song (1930) filmed partly in Pathécolor
 Her Reputation (1931)
 Many Waters (1931)

References

External links

1898 births
1933 deaths
People from Mile End
English film actresses
English silent film actresses
Suicides in Greater London
Drug-related suicides in England
Suicides by gas
Suicides by sharp instrument in England
Actresses from London
20th-century English actresses
1933 suicides